St Paul's Catholic School is a comprehensive co-educational secondary school in Leadenhall, Milton Keynes, England. It has specialist science and language college status and is also a Teacher Training College.

Ofsted reports 
The school was inspected again in 2005 and 2008, and in both cases it was judged to be "outstanding".

The school was inspected in late 2013, and was judged as "requires improvement" in every category. The report was quoted as saying: "It is not good because; Students do not make consistently good progress throughout the school, particularly the more able. There is also variation in standards between subjects at GCSE level. Not all teachers have sufficiently high expectations and do not plan lessons which challenge students according to their assessed needs, particularly those that are more able." In a further inspection in March 2016 the school was rated as "good".

Headteachers
 Paul Tubb (1987- 1994)
 Michael Manley (1994 - August 2016) - Previously Deputy Head and RE & Mathematics Teacher
 Jo-Anne Hoarty (Sep 2016 – present) - Previously Deputy Head, Assistant Head and English Teacher

Notable Former Pupils

 Brendan Galloway (Premier League Footballer)
 Kevin Danso (Footballer)
 Andrew Osei-Bonsu (Footballer)
 David Kasumu (Footballer)
 Ruchae Walton (Currently plays NCAA Division 1 Women's College Basketball for Portland State University)

References

External links
 School website

Secondary schools in Milton Keynes
Catholic secondary schools in the Diocese of Northampton
Voluntary aided schools in England
Specialist science colleges in England
Specialist language colleges in England